The Cedar Rapids Union Station served different railroads' passenger operations for six decades. The structure at 4th Street and 4th Avenue SE, Cedar Rapids, was opened with fanfare in 1897 with a gala for Cedar Rapids' charities. The station was 600 feet long with gargoyles. The interior of the main building was 40 by 400 feet and 27 feet high.

The station served the Chicago and North Western Railroad and the Rock Island Railroad, as such, it was a hub for trains from Minneapolis, Chicago, Omaha, St. Louis, Kansas City, Denver, Portland and the Oakland/San Francisco market. Additionally, Railway Post Office rail cars were handled at the station.

Cedar Rapids was accompanied by another railroad station, the Milwaukee Depot on 1st Avenue SE, serving trains of the Milwaukee Road and the Illinois Central.

In its later years service declined. In 1955, the Union Pacific Railroad changed its partner for the eastern leg of West Coast – Chicago trips from Chicago and North Western to the Milwaukee Road. As such, several trains were shifted over to the Milwaukee Road's station at Marion, a town on the northeastern periphery of Cedar Rapids. In 1957, two executives from the Chicago & North Western Railroad visited the station, decided that it was obsolete and moved to have it replaced. It was demolished in 1961 and replaced by a smaller structure. Amtrak took over intercity rail in the United States in 1971 and Cedar Rapids has not been served since.

Major named trains at mid-twentieth century were:

Chicago & North Western:  
All these trains routed out of Des Moines in 1955, as these routes were switched to Milwaukee Road, to Marion on the outskirts of the city.
Challenger Streamliner* – Chicago – Los Angeles
City of Denver* – Chicago – Denver
City of Los Angeles* – Chicago – Los Angeles
City of Portland* – Chicago – Portland
City of San Francisco* – Chicago – San Francisco
Gold Coast – Chicago – San Francisco  
L.A. Challenger – Chicago – Los Angeles
Overland Limited – Chicago – San Francisco
Pacific Limited – Chicago – San Francisco
San Francisco Challenger – Chicago – San Francisco

The above trains marked * persisted as Milwaukee Rd trains to 1971, albeit to Marion.

Rock Island: 
Zephyr Rocket – Minneapolis – St. Louis 

This was last named Rock Island train, serving Cedar Rapids until 1967. In the last years of service an unnamed train making the same route & local trains from Cedar Rapids to various parts of the state.

References

Railway stations in the United States opened in 1897
Railway stations closed in 1967
Former railway stations in Iowa
Cedar Rapids, Iowa
Former Chicago and North Western Railway stations
Former Burlington, Cedar Rapids and Northern Railway stations
Former Chicago, Rock Island and Pacific Railroad stations